The 50th Guillermo Mendoza Memorial Scholarship Foundation Box Office Entertainment Awards (GMMSF-BOEA) was an awarding ceremony honoring the actors, actresses, showbiz personalities, movies and TV programs in the Philippines. It was held on March 24, 2019 at the Star Theater, CCP Complex, Pasay.

Winners selection
The GMMSF honors Filipino actors, actresses and other performers' commercial success, regardless of artistic merit, in the Philippine entertainment industry. The award giving body selects the high-ranking Philippine films for the calendar year 2018 based on total average rankings at box office published results as basis for awarding the three major categories in the awarding ceremonies, The Phenomenal Box Office Star, The Box Office King and The Box Office Queen.

Winners

Film

Television

Music

Special Awards

References

Box Office Entertainment Awards
2019 film awards
2019 television awards
2019 music awards